Prem Mayee is a film about a woman, who takes way too long to realize who she really is and what is it that she wants from love, life and marriage.

Cast
 Chandrachur Singh as Arun
 Shreya Narayan as Payal
 Chitrashi Rawat as Shrishti
 Sanjay Suri as Nirvaan
 Auroshikha Dey as Megha
 Murali Sharma
 Yatin Karyekar

Soundtrack 
The music of the film is given by Abhishek Ray and lyrics is given by Shekhar S Jha.

Reception

References

External links 
 

2012 films
2010s Hindi-language films
Films scored by Abhishek Ray